Piaggine, also called “Chiaine“ in the local dialect, is a town and comune in the province of Salerno, in the region of Campania, in the south-west of Italy.

The town is located on the river Calore, 93 miles (150 km) south-east of Naples, 57 miles (92 km) north-west of Potenza.

According to the official data, the resident population in 2020 was 1231.

Piaggine was originally inhabited around 1000 A.D by a community of nomadic shepherds, which found green pastures among the mountains near the river.

The town is famous for being the birthplace of the notorious brigant Giuseppe Tardio.

Twin towns
 Sayalonga (Spain)

See also
Pruno Cilento
Cilento

References

External links

Comune of Piaggine

Cities and towns in Campania
Localities of Cilento